Thomas Hoggan Souter (born 26 March 1912) was a Scottish amateur footballer who played in the Scottish League for Queen's Park and Rangers as an outside forward. He was capped by Scotland at amateur level.

References 

1912 births
Year of death missing
Scottish footballers
Queen's Park F.C. players
Scottish Football League players
Scotland amateur international footballers
Association football outside forwards
Footballers from Perth and Kinross
Rangers F.C. players